Nogometni klub Malečnik, commonly referred to as NK Malečnik or simply Malečnik, is a Slovenian football club which plays in the town of Malečnik. The club was established in 1960.

Stadium
Malečnik play their home games at the Berl Sports Centre. In November 2012, the Drava river flooding completely destroyed their football pitch and all the equipment. In a charity event, organised by the 7 dni newspaper, all money from an auction was donated to NK Malečnik. Many Slovenian international footballers, including Luka Krajnc, Rene Krhin and Samir Handanović, donated their football shirts for an auction.

Honours
Slovenian Fourth Division
 Winners: 2000–01, 2004–05

Slovenian Fifth Division
 Winners: 1997–98

MNZ Maribor Cup
 Winners: 2010–11

References

External links
Official website 

Association football clubs established in 1960
Football clubs in Slovenia
1960 establishments in Slovenia